Silene invisa is a species of flowering plant in the family Caryophyllaceae known by the common names red fir catchfly and short-petaled campion.

It is endemic to California, where it is known only from the southernmost Cascade Range and northernmost Sierra Nevada. It grows in the coniferous forests of the mountains.

Description
Silene invisa is a perennial herb growing up to about 40 centimeters tall from a leafy caudex and taproot. The linear or lance-shaped leaves are a few centimeters long low on the plant and smaller farther up the stem.

The inflorescence is a solitary flower or a cyme of up to three flowers at the top of the stem. Each flower has a bell-shaped calyx of fused sepals lined with ten green veins and covered in short, glandular hairs. The strap-shaped or rectangular petals have blunt tips or may be notched. They are whitish to pinkish or lavender and sometimes barely protrude from the calyx.

References

External links

 Jepson Manual Treatment of Silene invisa
 USDA Plants Profile
 Flora of North America
 UC Photos gallery: Silene invisa

invisa
Endemic flora of California
Flora of the Cascade Range
Flora of the Sierra Nevada (United States)
Flora without expected TNC conservation status